She Monkeys is a 2011 Swedish drama film directed by Lisa Aschan, starring Mathilda Paradeiser, Linda Molin and Isabella Lindqvist. The film focuses on psychological power struggles between two teenage girls engaged in equestrian vaulting.

Plot

Cast
 Mathilda Paradeiser as Emma
 Linda Molin as Cassandra
 Isabella Lindqvist as Sara
 Sergej Merkusjev as Ivan
 Adam Lundgren as Jens
 Sigmund Hovind as Tobias
 Kevin Caicedo Vega as Sebastian

Production
She Monkeys was produced as part of the Swedish Film Institute's Rookie Project, which provided financial support for which only debuting feature-film directors are eligible. Inspirations for the film included a picture of Shirley Temple and the book Story of the Eye by George Bataille. Casting of the lead actors took four months. The filmmakers needed to find girls who not only could act, but also met the requirements of the physically demanding roles.

Release
The film premiered on 31 January 2011 at the Gothenburg Film Festival. Several festival selections followed, including Berlin where it screened in the section Generation 14Plus, Tribeca and Karlovy Vary. The earliest regular release was in France, where ASC Distribution launched the film on 3 August 2011. The Swedish release is set to 2 September 2011 through TriArt Film.

Reception
Alissa Simon of Variety called the film "one of the most intense and complex feature debuts to come from Sweden since Lukas Moodysson's Show Me Love", and wrote: "Aschan's provocative visual language links pleasure and pain as she focuses on the arousing nature of unpleasant things. Carefully framed compositions that are near cliche (a father cuddling his young child, a babysitter helping a youngster with tooth brushing) take on fresh significance. ... Just as remarkably, Aschan draws convincing, naturalistic performances from her young non-pro actors while putting them in highly charged situations."

At the Gothenburg Film Festival, She Monkeys received the top competition prize, the Dragon Award for Best Nordic Film, with one million kronor in prize money. It also won the festival's FIPRESCI prize. The film received the award for Best Narrative Feature, World Narrative Competition Section at the Tribeca Film Festival. Linda Wassberg won the prize for Best Cinematography at the Transilvania International Film Festival in Romania.

References

External links
Official website

Official Mathilda Paradeiser website

2011 films
Horse sports in film
Swedish drama films
2010s Swedish-language films
Best Film Guldbagge Award winners
2011 drama films
2010s Swedish films